Nassauer Hof is a luxury five-star superior hotel in Wiesbaden, Germany, and member of the international association The Leading Hotels of the World as well as the German association Selektion Deutscher Luxushotels . The property was built in 1813 and is situated across from the Wiesbaden Kurhaus and at the end of Wiesbaden's luxury shopping avenue Wilhelmstrasse.

Restaurant
Without a break, the hotel's restaurant ENTE has been awarded with a Michelin star for more than 30 years.

Notable guests

 Fyodor Dostoyevsky
 Wilhelm II
 Nicholas II
 Walther Rathenau
 Paul von Hindenburg
 John F. Kennedy
 Richard Nixon
 Audrey Hepburn
 Luciano Pavarotti
 Reinhold Messner
 Dalai Lama
 Vladimir Putin
 Willem-Alexander & Máxima of the Netherlands

References

External links
 
 Official site 

Hotels in Germany
Buildings and structures in Wiesbaden
1813 establishments in the Duchy of Nassau
Hotel buildings completed in 1813
Tourist attractions in Wiesbaden